The Mamanguape River is a river in the Paraíba state, Northeastern Brazil.

Part of the river basin is in the  Guaribas Biological Reserve, a fully protected conservation unit created in 1990.

See also
List of rivers of Paraíba

References

Rivers of Paraíba